Viorica Ionică (20 June 1955 – 16 August 2020) was a Romanian handball player who competed in the 1976 Summer Olympics. She was part of the Romanian handball team, which finished fourth in the Olympic tournament. She played all five matches.

References

1955 births
2020 deaths
Romanian female handball players 
Olympic handball players of Romania
Handball players at the 1976 Summer Olympics